The 1981–82 Denver Nuggets season was their 15th season, and their sixth in the NBA. During the 1981–82 season, they scored at least 100 points in every game and allowed at least 100 points in every game. They returned to the postseason for the first time since the 1978–79 season.

In the playoffs, the Nuggets lost to the Phoenix Suns in three games in the First Round.

Draft picks

Roster

Regular season

Season standings

Notes
 z, y – division champions
 x – clinched playoff spot

Record vs. opponents

Game log

Playoffs

|- align="center" bgcolor="#ccffcc"
| 1
| April 20
| Phoenix
| W 129–113
| Kiki VanDeWeghe (29)
| Alex English (10)
| English, McKinney (5)
| McNichols Sports Arena17,298
| 1–0
|- align="center" bgcolor="#ffcccc"
| 2
| April 23
| @ Phoenix
| L 110–126
| Dan Issel (26)
| Alex English (6)
| English, Gondrezick (5)
| Arizona Veterans Memorial Coliseum12,798
| 1–1
|- align="center" bgcolor="#ffcccc"
| 3
| April 24
| Phoenix
| L 119–124
| Dan Issel (26)
| Issel, Dunn (10)
| Alex English (7)
| McNichols Sports Arena17,443
| 1–2
|-

Player statistics

Season

Playoffs

Awards and records
 Alex English, All-NBA Second Team

Records

Milestones

Transactions

Trades

Free Agents

See also
 1981-82 NBA season

References
 Nuggets on Basketball Reference

Denver Nuggets seasons
Den
Denver Nugget
Denver Nugget